

National team

Friendlies

FIFA World Cup 2010 Qualifiers

Welsh Cup  

Bangor City beat Port Talbot Town 3-2 at Parc y Scarlets.

Welsh League Cup  

The New Saints beat Rhyl 3-1 in the final of the Welsh League Cup.

Welsh Premier League 

 Champions: The New Saints

In line with the restructuring of the league the bottom 8 teams were relegated:
Haverfordwest County were relegated to the Welsh Football League Division One whilst Bala Town, Newtown, Connah's Quay, Porthmadog, Welshpool Town, Caersws and Cefn Druids were relegated to the Cymru Alliance.

Welsh Football League Division One 

 Champions: to be confirmed

Cymru Alliance League 

 Champions: Langefni Town - Promoted to Welsh Premier League

The Welsh Premier Women's League 

 Champions: Swansea City Ladies - Qualified for Women's Champions League

 
Seasons in Welsh football